Laurell may refer to:

 Laurell K. Hamilton, American fantasy and romance writer
 Anna Laurell Nash, Swedish boxer
 Valtteri Laurell Pöyhönen, Finnish jazz guitarist, pianist, composer, bandleader and producer
 Jacinda Kate Laurell Ardern, politician and Prime Minister of New Zealand

 Carl-Bertil Laurell, Swedish medical doctor and researcher
 Kay Laurell (born Ruth Leslie), American stage and silent film actress and model
 Laurell (singer), Canadian singer and songwriter

See also 
 Laurel (disambiguation)